The Peteetneet Museum and Cultural Arts Center is a multi-purpose civic building located in Payson, Utah, United States.

Description
The facility is named after Chief Peteetneet, the indigenous clan leader of a Tumpanawach (Timpanogos) Ute band, and a monument of him stands at the front of Center. The building houses a Daughters of the Utah Pioneers museum of pioneer artifacts, the Payson Historical Society, and the Peteetneet Arts Council as well as many community art and dance classes and events. The large hill behind the building is a popular place for watersliding in the summer and sledding in the winter.

History
Prior to serving as a museum and cultural arts center, the Peteetneet School or Peteetneet Academy was erected in 1901. The Victorian belfry makes this school more flamboyant than other prominent schools designed by Watkins such as the Maeser School or Old Spring City School. The building served as an academy and then elementary school until 1989 when Payson City planned to demolish the building. A group of concerned citizens formed People Preserving Peteetneet and were instrumental in saving and restoring the school. Since the building is located on the Nebo Loop Scenic Byway, the Utah Department of Transportation awarded over $100,000 to assist in the restoration. The building was transformed into a museum and civic center. A glass elevator was added in 2008. The building has been listed on the National Register of Historic Places since May 30, 1990.

See also

 National Register of Historic Places listings in Utah County, Utah

Notes

External links

 

School buildings completed in 1901
Defunct schools in Utah
Government buildings on the National Register of Historic Places in Utah
Museums in Utah County, Utah
Romanesque architecture
Romanesque Revival architecture in Utah
Schools in Utah County, Utah
School buildings on the National Register of Historic Places in Utah
Victorian architecture in Utah
Tourist attractions in Utah County, Utah
History museums in Utah
Art museums and galleries in Utah
Historic districts on the National Register of Historic Places in Utah
National Register of Historic Places in Utah County, Utah
Buildings and structures in Payson, Utah
1901 establishments in Utah